Three Stories and Ten Poems  is a collection of short stories and poems by Ernest Hemingway. It was privately published in 1923 in a run of 300 copies by Robert McAlmon's "Contact Publishing" in Paris.

The three stories are: 
 "Up in Michigan"
 "Out of Season"
 "My Old Man"

The ten poems are: 
 "Mitraigliatrice"
 "Oklahoma"
 "Oily Weather"
 "Roosevelt"
 "Captives"
 "Champs d'Honneur"
 "Riparto d'Assalto"
 "Montparnasse"
 "Along With Youth"
 "Chapter Heading"

References

External links
 
 

1923 short story collections
1923 poetry books
Short story collections by Ernest Hemingway
Poetry by Ernest Hemingway
American poetry collections
1923 debut works